Patrick Joseph Walsh (born 9 April 1931) is an Irish prelate of the Roman Catholic Church. From 1991 until 2008 he was the 31st Bishop of Down & Connor.

Early life and education
Walsh was born in 1931 at Cobh, Irish Free State. When he was 11 years old, his RIC father moved the family to Belfast, Northern Ireland, where he attended St Marys CBGS Belfast and won university scholarships in both science and literature. 

He entered St. Malachy's College as a seminarian, attending Queen's University Belfast. During Philosophy studies at Queen's he was taught by the future archbishop of Armagh, Dr Cahal Daly. He then studied theology at the Pontifical Lateran University, Rome, completed a Licentiate in Sacred Theology and was ordained priest on 25 February 1956.

Priestly ministry
After ordination Bishop Daniel Mageean sent Walsh for further studies to St Edmund's College, Cambridge (then known as St Edmund's House). He completed a M.Sc. in Mathematics at Christ's College, Cambridge, since St Edmund's was at the time unable to matriculate students of its own. He obtained another M.Sc. in 1962, from Queen's University, for a thesis on group characters.

He was assigned as a mathematics teacher at St MacNissi's College, Garron Tower from 1958 to 1964. He was then chaplain, along with Fr Ambrose Macaulay, at Queen's from 1964 to 1970.

In 1970 he was appointed president of St. Malachy's College and served in this role until he became a bishop in 1983. Thereafter he served as chairman of the board of governors for the college for many years.

Bishop 

In 1983, with Dr Anthony Farquhar he was appointed Auxiliary Bishop of the Diocese of Down and Connor and was consecrated on 15 May by Bishop Cahal Daly, Archbishop Gaetano Alibrandi and Bishop William Philbin. During the ordination ceremony, the assistant priests to Bishop Walsh were Fr Charles Agnew and Fr Hugh Crossin. He was given the titular see of Ros Cré. His Episcopal Motto is 'Ex Animo Operari', to work with one's heart (Col 3:24).

In 1991, on the elevation of the then Bishop Daly as Archbishop of Armagh, Dr Walsh became the 31st Bishop of Down & Connor.

He was the Principal Consecrator of Bishop Michael Dallat and Bishop Donal McKeown.

He was succeeded as bishop by Monsignor Noel Treanor on 22 February 2008.

References 
Diocese of Down & Connor
Patrick J Walsh on Catholic Hierarchy
 Comments by Secretary of the Congregation for Divine Worship on disobedience by bishops

Specific

1931 births
Clergy from Cobh
Living people
People educated at St. Mary's Christian Brothers' Grammar School, Belfast
Alumni of Queen's University Belfast
Alumni of Christ's College, Cambridge
20th-century Roman Catholic bishops in Ireland
21st-century Roman Catholic bishops in Ireland
Roman Catholic bishops of Down and Connor